Dr. John Babcock House is a historic home located at Selkirk in Albany County, New York.

Description and history 
It was built in 1851 and consists of a three-by-three-bay, two-story red brick main block with a one-story summer kitchen addition. It represents a transitional Greek Revival/Italianate style. The main block has a hipped roof and sits on a limestone ashlar foundation.

It was listed on the National Register of Historic Places on December 10, 2003.

References

Houses on the National Register of Historic Places in New York (state)
Greek Revival houses in New York (state)
Italianate architecture in New York (state)
Houses completed in 1851
Houses in Albany County, New York
1851 establishments in New York (state)
National Register of Historic Places in Albany County, New York